Bridget Staff Masango (born 23 February 1962) is a South African Democratic Alliance politician from Gauteng who has served as the Shadow Minister of Social Development since October 2015. She has also been a Member of the National Assembly since October 2015. From May 2014 to October 2015, Masango served as a permanent delegate to the National Council of Provinces.

Background
Masango was born in Kwambonambi in the north of the former Natal Province (now KwaZulu-Natal). She is the sixth of nine children. She soon moved to the Transvaal Province, where her father found employment as a security guard.

She worked for Group 5, where she met veteran Democratic Alliance politician Michael Moriarty. Masango was a member of the Inkatha Freedom Party and before she became active in the DA, she worked as a communications manager for the Nelson Mandela Children's Foundation.

National Council of Provinces (2014–2015)
Prior to the 2014 general election, she was ranked low on both the DA's national and regional lists. She was not elected to the National Assembly, the lower house, as a consequence. However, the DA selected her to represent the party in the National Council of Provinces, the upper house. On 22 May 2014, Masango was sworn in as Gauteng's permanent delegate to the NCOP.

On 3 October 2015, the DA leader in the National Assembly, Mmusi Maimane, appointed her as Shadow Minister of Social Development. She resigned from the NCOP on 5 October.

Committee assignments
Select Committee on Education and Recreation
Select Committee on Social Services
Select Committee on Communications and Public Enterprises
Select Committee on Land and Mineral Resources

National Assembly
On 6 October 2015, Masango entered the National Assembly. She became a member of the Portfolio Committee on Social Development on 15 October. In 2016, Masango questioned who paid for then-Minister of Social Development Bathabile Dlamini's R110,000 stay at The Oyster Box hotel.

On 15 February 2017, she delivered her maiden speech at the annual State of the Nation Address debate. Masango was re-elected at the 2019 general election. In June 2020, Masango called on president Cyril Ramaphosa to remove Lindiwe Zulu as Minister of Social Development.

In December 2020, Masango was re-appointed to her shadow cabinet role by the newly elected DA leader, John Steenhuisen.

Committee assignment
Portfolio Committee on Social Development

Personal life
Masango was married and has one daughter. Her one brother died in May 2015.

References

External links
National Assembly profile

Living people
1962 births
Zulu people
People from KwaZulu-Natal
People from Gauteng
Democratic Alliance (South Africa) politicians
Members of the National Assembly of South Africa
Women members of the National Assembly of South Africa
Members of the National Council of Provinces
Women members of the National Council of Provinces